

The Durand Mk V was a two-seat sports biplane aircraft developed in the United States in the 1970s and marketed for home building. The design was distinctive due to a large negative stagger on the wings, but was otherwise conventional. The single-bay wings were braced with I-struts, and while both upper and lower wings were equipped with full-span flaps, lateral control was by spoilers on the lower wing rather than ailerons. Flight testing revealed that the aircraft was impossible to stall. The pilot and single passenger sat side by side beneath an expansive canopy, and the undercarriage was of fixed, tricycle type.

Durand sold 75 sets of plans by 1987, and by that time, at least five aircraft (including the prototype) were known to be flying. By 1998 the company said 91 sets of plans had been sold and nine aircraft flown.

Specifications (typical)

References

External links

 Durand Mk V at the Museum of Flight, Seattle The Durand Mark V has disappeared from the Museum of flight and they do not know where it went.

1970s United States sport aircraft
Homebuilt aircraft
Mark V
Single-engined tractor aircraft
Biplanes with negative stagger
Aircraft first flown in 1978